Daniël de Jong (born 9 July 1992) is a professional racing driver from the Netherlands.

Career

Formula Renault 2.0
After a lengthy karting career in his native Holland and a brief stint in the Dutch Winter Endurance Series, de Jong made his single–seater debut in 2008 in the Formula Renault 2.0 Northern European Cup (NEC), finishing the season 13th overall. He also contested two races in the Formula Renault 2.0 NEZ series, taking two pole positions and a race victory to finish the season in 8th place, and a single round of the Formula Renault 2.0 West European Cup at Spa–Francorchamps.

In 2009, de Jong took part in both the Eurocup Formula Renault 2.0 and Formula Renault 2.0 NEC championships with MP Motorsport. In the Eurocup, he took a single points–finish at the Hungaroring to be classified in 25th place, whilst in the NEC series he took podium places at the Nürburgring and Spa–Francorchamps to finish 9th, despite missing the third round of the season at Alastaro.

2010 saw de Jong remain in the Eurocup Formula Renault 2.0 series for a second season. After finishing second to Kevin Korjus in the first race of the season at Motorland Aragón, he finished in the points on a further eight occasions to finish 9th in the standings. He also took part in selected events of the Formula Renault 2.0 NEC season, taking a race win at the final event of the season at the Nürburgring together with a second–place at Brno earlier in the season. He finished the year 11th in the standings, despite only taking part in six of the 18 races.

Formula Renault 3.5 Series

In October 2010, de Jong drove a Formula Renault 3.5 Series car for the first time, testing for Draco Racing at the first post–season test in Barcelona. A week later he tested for Comtec Racing at Motorland Aragón and it was announced in February 2011 that he had signed to race for the team in the 2011 season, partnering British Formula 3 graduate Daniel McKenzie.

Auto GP
Alongside his Formula Renault 3.5 commitments, de Jong also contested the Auto GP season in 2011, driving for his long–time Formula Renault 2.0 team MP Motorsport. He remained with the team (now in a partnership with Manor Motorsport) for the 2012 season.

GP2 Series
In 2012, de Jong made his GP2 Series debut at the Valencia Street Circuit, driving for the Rapax team. He also drove for the team at Silverstone, and will also do so at the Hungaroring and at Circuit de Spa-Francorchamps. He is the third Dutchman in the championship, alongside Giedo van der Garde and Nigel Melker. He missed the round at Hockenheim due to his Auto GP commitments, but returned to action in the next round at the Hungaroring. He was then replaced by Stefano Coletti for the round at Monza.

Racing record

Career summary

† As de Jong was a guest driver, he was ineligible for championship points.

Complete Formula Renault 3.5 Series results
(key) (Races in bold indicate pole position) (Races in italics indicate fastest lap)

Complete Auto GP Results
(key) (Races in bold indicate pole position) (Races in italics indicate fastest lap)

Complete GP2 Series results
(key) (Races in bold indicate pole position) (Races in italics indicate fastest lap)

† Driver did not finish, but was classified as he completed over 90% of the race distance.

References

External links
Official website

1992 births
Living people
Sportspeople from Rotterdam
Dutch racing drivers
Formula Renault Eurocup drivers
Formula Renault 2.0 NEC drivers
Formula Renault 2.0 WEC drivers
Formula Renault 2.0 NEZ drivers
Finland Formula Renault 2.0 drivers
World Series Formula V8 3.5 drivers
Auto GP drivers
GP2 Series drivers
24H Series drivers
MP Motorsport drivers
Manor Motorsport drivers
Comtec Racing drivers
Rapax Team drivers
Trident Racing drivers